Pál Dárdai (9 May 1951 – 8 December 2017) was a Hungarian football player and manager.

Playing career
After playing with Véménd as a youngster, he began his senior career playing as midfielder with Honvéd Steinmetz. In 1972, he moved to Komlói Bányász where he spent two seasons before joining Pécsi MFC in 1974, playing in the Hungarian Championship. He played with Pécsi for more than a decade, making 284 league appearances and scoring 67 goals. He left Hungary at winter-break with a strong reputation and joined FK Vojvodina in the Yugoslav First League in the 1985–86 season, where he played along with his compatriot János Borsó. In 1988–89, he had spells with Pécsi MFC and Beremendi Építők before retiring.

Coaching career
Pál Dárdai, after finishing his playing career, became a coach. He managed a number of Hungarian clubs.

Personal life
He was the father of the former Hungarian international footballer and later coach Pál Dárdai, and the grandfather of Palkó Dárdai and Márton Dárdai.

On 20 July 2002, Dardai's other son, Balázs Dárdai, midfielder of FC Barcs, died aged 23 during a tournament on Saturday after an artery burst when he jumped for a ball. Pál Dárdai was watching the game as the coach of FC Barcs when it happened.

On 8 December 2017, Pál Dárdai's death was announced.

References

External sources
 Stats from Hungarian Championship at nela.hu

1951 births
2017 deaths
Hungarian footballers
Association football midfielders
Komlói Bányász SK footballers
Pécsi MFC players
FK Vojvodina players
Yugoslav First League players
Hungarian football managers
Pécsi MFC managers
Hungarian expatriate footballers
Hungarian expatriate sportspeople in Yugoslavia
Expatriate footballers in Yugoslavia
Sportspeople from Baranya County